Isabel Martins was a Mozambican politician. In 1977 she was one of the first group of women elected to the People's Assembly.

Biography
During the Mozambican War of Independence she travelled to Algeria, where FRELIMO fighters receive training. She was a FRELIMO candidate in the 1977 parliamentary elections, in which she was one of the first group of 27 women elected to the People's Assembly. She married Camilo de Sousa; one of their children, Camila Maissune de Sousa, became a well-known artist.

References

Date of birth unknown
FRELIMO politicians
Members of the Assembly of the Republic (Mozambique)
20th-century Mozambican women politicians
20th-century Mozambican politicians
Possibly living people